Ricardo Bonelli (28 October 1932 – 25 July 2009) was an Argentine footballer. He played in eight matches for the Argentina national football team from 1954 to 1956. He was also part of Argentina's squad for the 1956 South American Championship.

References

External links
 

1932 births
2009 deaths
Argentine footballers
Argentina international footballers
Association football forwards
Sportspeople from Lanús
Club Atlético Independiente footballers